Mercury(IV) fluoride, HgF4, is the first mercury compound to be reported with mercury in the +4 oxidation state. Mercury, like the other group 12 elements (cadmium and zinc), has an s2d10 electron configuration and generally only forms bonds involving its 6s orbital. This means that the highest oxidation state mercury normally attains is +2, and for this reason it is usually considered a post-transition metal instead of a transition metal. HgF4 was first reported from experiments in 2007, but its existence remains disputed; experiments conducted in 2008 could not replicate the compound.

History
Speculation about higher oxidation states for mercury had existed since the 1970s, and theoretical calculations in the 1990s predicted that it should be stable in the gas phase, with a square-planar geometry consistent with a formal d8 configuration. However, experimental proof remained elusive until 2007, when HgF4 was first prepared using solid neon and argon for matrix isolation at a temperature of 4 K. The compound was detected using infrared spectroscopy. Analysis of density functional theory and coupled cluster calculations showed that the d orbitals are involved in bonding. This has led to the suggestion that mercury should be considered a transition metal after all (the group 12 metals are sometimes not included as transition metals because they do not have oxidation states beyond +2). However, that conclusion has been challenged by W. B. Jensen with the argument that HgF4 only exists under highly atypical non-equilibrium conditions and should best be considered as an exception.

Explanation
Theoretical studies suggest that mercury is unique among the natural elements of group 12 in forming a tetrafluoride, and attribute this observation to relativistic effects. According to calculations, the tetrafluorides of the "less relativistic" elements cadmium and zinc are unstable and eliminate a fluorine molecule, F2, to form the metal difluoride complex. On the other hand, the tetrafluoride of the "more relativistic" synthetic element 112, copernicium, is predicted to be more stable. However, more recent theoretical studies cast doubt on the possible existence of mercury(IV) and even copernicium(IV) fluoride.

Synthesis and properties
HgF4 is produced by the reaction of elemental mercury with fluorine:

Hg + 2 F2 →  HgF4

HgF4 →  HgF2 + F2

HgF4 is a diamagnetic, square planar molecule. The mercury atom has a formal 6s25d86p6 electron configuration, and as such obeys the octet rule but not the 18-electron rule.  HgF4 is isoelectronic with the tetrafluoroaurate anion, and is valence isoelectronic with the tetrachloroaurate, tetrabromoaurate, and tetrachloroplatinate anions.

References

Mercury compounds
Fluorides
Metal halides
Hypothetical chemical compounds
Substances discovered in the 2000s